Skelton Le Roy "Buddy" Napier (18 December 1889 – 29 March 1968), was a Major League baseball pitcher from 1912 to 1921.  He was born in Byromville, Georgia.

Major league career
Napier played his first major league game with the St. Louis Browns, on August 14, 1912, versus the Boston Red Sox, which the Browns lost 0-8.  Napier signed on with the Chicago Cubs in 1918, pitching in only 1 game for the whole season. In 1920 he signed on with the Cincinnati Reds, and played for 2 more seasons before retiring.  His final game was on July 16, 1921 in a doubleheader against the Philadelphia Phillies.

Buddy Napier died at the age of 78 on March 29, 1968 in Hutchins, Texas.

External links

 Napier's career stats

1889 births
1968 deaths
Baseball players from Georgia (U.S. state)
Major League Baseball pitchers
St. Louis Browns players
Chicago Cubs players
Cincinnati Reds players
Brownsville Brownies players
Houston Buffaloes players
Montgomery Rebels players
Beaumont Oilers players
Shreveport Gassers players
Atlanta Crackers players
St. Paul Saints (AA) players
Omaha Buffaloes players